Lisa Raymond was the defending champion, but lost in the semifinals to Dominique Van Roost.

Brenda Schultz-McCarthy won the title, defeating Van Roost 6–4, 6–7(4–7), 7–5 in the final.

Seeds

Draw

Finals

Top half

Bottom half

References
Main Draw and Qualifying Draw

Challenge Bell
Tournoi de Québec
Can